Justitia (minor planet designation: 269 Justitia) is a fairly sizeable main belt asteroid.

It was discovered by Johann Palisa on 21 September 1887 in Vienna.

The asteroid was named after Justitia, the Roman equivalent of Themis, the Greek goddess of justice (she also has an asteroid named after her, 24 Themis).

As discovered in 2021, the asteroid has a very red color due to tholins on its surface, similar to trans-Neptunian objects. It is therefore thought to have formed in the outer Solar System despite its current orbit within the asteroid belt.

References 

The Asteroid Orbital Elements Database
Minor Planet Discovery Circumstances
Asteroid Lightcurve Data File

External links
 
 

Background asteroids
Justitia
Justitia
Ld-type asteroids (SMASS)
18870921